Christian Howard may refer to:

 Christian Howard (theologian) (1916–1999), British theologian and founding member of the Movement for the Ordination of Women
 Christian Howard (footballer) (born 1991), Australian rules footballer
 Christian Howard (actor) (born 1984), British actor, model and martial artist, best known for portraying Ken Masters in Street Fighter: Legacy and Street Fighter: Assassin's Fist
 Christian Howard (born 1965), American baseball pitcher professionally known as Chris Howard (pitcher)

See also
Chris Howard (disambiguation)